The Palavecino Municipality is one of the nine municipalities (municipios) that makes up the Venezuelan state of Lara and, according to a 2011 population estimate by the National Institute of Statistics of Venezuela, the municipality has a population of 174,099.  The town of Cabudare is the shire town of the Palavecino Municipality.

Demographics
The Palavecino Municipality, according to a 2011 population estimate by the National Institute of Statistics of Venezuela, has a population of 174,099 (up from 155,653 in 2007). This amounts to 9.8% of the state's population.

Government
The mayor of the Palavecino Municipality is Mirla Vires, elected in 2017 with 64.85% of the vote and 59.23% abstention.  The municipality is divided into three parishes; Cabudare, José Gregorio Bastidas, and Agua Viva
.

See also
Cabudare
Lara
Municipalities of Venezuela

References

External links
palavecino-lara.gob.ve 

Municipalities of Lara (state)